Dai Thomas  (1 August 1926 – 14 November 2014) was a Welsh international footballer full back. He was part of the Wales national football team, playing 2 matches. He played his first match on 26 May 1957 against Czechoslovakia and his last match on 25 September 1957 against East Germany . At club level, he played for Swansea Town between 1949 and 1960. He played 296 matches scoring 15 goals. He also played for Hereford United.

See also
 List of Wales international footballers (alphabetical)

References

1926 births
2014 deaths
Welsh footballers
Wales international footballers
Swansea City A.F.C. players
Hereford United F.C. players
Place of birth missing
Association football fullbacks